Tapae was a fortified settlement, guarding Sarmizegetusa, the main political centre of Dacia. Its location was on the Iron Gates of Transylvania, a natural passage breaking between Țarcului and Poiana Ruscă Mountains and connecting Banat to Țara Hațegului. This made it one of the very few points through which invaders could enter Transylvania from the south. Moreover, 8 kilometres down the passage into Țara Hațegului, there is Sarmizegetusa Regia.

Dio Cassius notes the existence of a military camp there during the Dacian Wars. The place is the site of four battles between Dacians and Romans.

Nowadays there is a small village on this site named Zeicani, located within Sarmizegetusa commune.

References

Dacian fortresses in Romania